Zhu Min (born May 11, 1988 in Changzhou, Jiangsu) is a Chinese sabre fencer. She won a gold medal, as a member of the host nation's fencing team, in the same weapon at the 2010 Asian Games in Guangzhou. Zhu is also a member of the Nanjing Province Fencing Team, and is coached and trained by Christian Bauer of France.

Zhu represented China at the 2012 Summer Olympics in London, where she competed in the women's individual sabre event, along with her teammate Chen Xiaodong. She defeated Romania's Bianca Pascu and Russia's Yuliya Gavrilova in the preliminary rounds, before losing out the quarterfinal match to U.S. fencer and two-time Olympic champion Mariel Zagunis, with a final score of 10–15.

Zhu is married to fellow Jiangsu fencer Jiang Kelü.

References

External links
Profile – FIE
NBC Olympics Profile

1988 births
Living people
Chinese female fencers
Olympic fencers of China
Fencers at the 2012 Summer Olympics
Asian Games medalists in fencing
Sportspeople from Changzhou
Fencers from Jiangsu
Fencers at the 2010 Asian Games
Asian Games gold medalists for China
Medalists at the 2010 Asian Games
21st-century Chinese women